Connah's Quay & Shotton F.C. was a Welsh football team based at Connah's Quay in Flintshire.

The club  formed in 1920, renting land at the rear of the Halfway House Hotel from the Northgate Brewery, and become members of the Welsh National League (North) as a fully professional outfit in 1922.

The club played in the English FA Cup during the 1920s and joined the Cheshire County League in 1929.  Runners-up to Port Vale in their first campaign, they slipped to 18th the following season and disbanded halfway through the 1931–32 season.

See also
Connah's Quay Nomads F.C.: the present day club

References

1920 establishments in Wales
1932 disestablishments in Wales
Defunct football clubs in Wales
Sport in Flintshire
Association football clubs established in 1920
Association football clubs disestablished in 1932
Welsh National League (North) clubs
Cheshire County League clubs